Jesus Loves You could refer to:

 Jesus Loves You (band), a British band that included Boy George
 "Jesus Loves You (But Not As Much As I Do)", a song by Eve's Plum from album Cherry Alive
 "Jesus Loves You", a song by Jewel from her album This Way
 "Jesus Loves You", a song by Christian pop punk band Stellar Kart from their album Expect the Impossible

See also
"Jesus Loves Me", a Christian hymn written by Anna Bartlett Warner